Vaughan William Ryan (born 2 September 1968) is an English former professional footballer who played as a midfielder in the Football League for Wimbledon, Sheffield United and Leyton Orient. He was appointed first-team coach at AFC Wimbledon by former Wimbledon teammate Wally Downes in June 2019, continuing in the role under Glyn Hodges.

References

1968 births
Living people
Footballers from Westminster
English footballers
Association football midfielders
Wimbledon F.C. players
Sheffield United F.C. players
Leyton Orient F.C. players
English Football League players